The Central African Republic women's national under-18 basketball team is a national basketball team of the Central African Republic, administered by the Fédération Centrafricaine de Basketball.

It represents the country in international women's under-18 (under age 18) basketball competitions.

See also
Central African Republic women's national basketball team
Central African Republic men's national under-18 basketball team

References

External links
Archived records of Central African Republic team participations

Central African Republic women's national basketball team
Women's national under-18 basketball teams